Candelabrum capensis, or gnome's hat hydroid, is a species of sessile hydroid cnidarian. It is a member of the family Candelabridae.

Description
The gnome's hat hydroid grows to about 3 cm tall. It is a small conical hydroid with 30-40 adhesive knobs at its base. The cone is made up of 400-600 densely packed warty tentacles which contain the stinging cells. Its colour is variable, from a purple-brown to magenta  or pale pink.

Distribution
This species is found around the southern African coast from Luderitz in Namibia to East London from the subtidal to at least 27m underwater.

Ecology
These animals are usually found among red seaweed and brown seagrass, singly or in small groups.

References

External links

Candelabridae
Animals described in 1940